Welcome Bay is a suburb of Tauranga, New Zealand. Neighbouring suburbs include Hairini and Maungatapu. There are a number of schools in Welcome Bay, including three primary schools.

The name Welcome Bay has been used for the area as early as 1872 by the Bay of Plenty Times.

Demographics

Welcome Bay had a population of 10,284 at the 2018 New Zealand census, an increase of 1,617 people (18.7%) since the 2013 census, and an increase of 2,757 people (36.6%) since the 2006 census. There were 3,372 households, comprising 5,088 males and 5,199 females, giving a sex ratio of 0.98 males per female, with 2,493 people (24.2%) aged under 15 years, 1,833 (17.8%) aged 15 to 29, 4,656 (45.3%) aged 30 to 64, and 1,308 (12.7%) aged 65 or older.

Ethnicities were 80.1% European/Pākehā, 22.5% Māori, 3.3% Pacific peoples, 6.6% Asian, and 2.5% other ethnicities. People may identify with more than one ethnicity.

The percentage of people born overseas was 21.6, compared with 27.1% nationally.

Although some people chose not to answer the census's question about religious affiliation, 53.4% had no religion, 32.2% were Christian, 2.9% had Māori religious beliefs, 0.8% were Hindu, 0.1% were Muslim, 0.5% were Buddhist and 2.9% had other religions.

Of those at least 15 years old, 1,521 (19.5%) people had a bachelor's or higher degree, and 1,203 (15.4%) people had no formal qualifications. 1,194 people (15.3%) earned over $70,000 compared to 17.2% nationally. The employment status of those at least 15 was that 4,035 (51.8%) people were employed full-time, 1,260 (16.2%) were part-time, and 330 (4.2%) were unemployed.

Marae

The local Tahuwhakatiki or Romai Marae and its Rongomainohorangi meeting house are a traditional meeting place for the Ngāti Ranginui hapū of Pirirākau.

In October 2020, the Government committed $500,000 from the Provincial Growth Fund to upgrade the marae, creating 6 jobs.

Climate

Welcome Bay is a sub-tropical climate zone, with warm humid summers and mild winters. Typical summer daytime maximum air temperatures range from 22°C to 26°C, but seldom exceed 30°C. Winter daytime maximum air temperatures range from 12°C to 17°C. Annual sunshine hours average least 2200 hours. Southwest winds prevail for much of the year. Sea breezes often occur on warm summer days. Winter usually has more rain and is the most unsettled time of year. In summer and autumn, storms of tropical origin may bring high winds and heavy rainfall from the east or northeast.

Transport

Public transport in Welcome Bay solely consists of bus services. The suburb is served by one 'Bay Hopper' routes; Route 40(City - 15th Ave - Welcome Bay).

Education

References

Suburbs of Tauranga
Populated places around the Tauranga Harbour